Connecticut's 12th Senate district elects one member of the Connecticut Senate. The district consists of the towns of Branford, North Branford, Durham, Guilford, Killingworth, and Madison.  Its current senator is Christine Cohen. 
The district boundaries established after the 2010 Census are the same as those established after the 2000 Census.

List of senators 1830 to 1900

List of senators 1900 to the present 
At this point redistricting caused Fairfield County to be represented in the Senate by the 25th and  26th District.

See also 
 History of Norwalk, Connecticut
 List of mayors of Norwalk, Connecticut
 List of members of the Connecticut General Assembly from Norwalk

References

External links 
 Google Maps - Connecticut General Assembly Senate Districts 

12
History of Fairfield County, Connecticut